The yellow-headed blackbird (Xanthocephalus xanthocephalus) is a medium-sized blackbird with a yellow head.

It is the only member of the genus Xanthocephalus.

Description 
Measurements:

 Length: 8.3-10.2 in (21-26 cm)
 Weight: 1.6-3.5 oz (44-100 g)
 Wingspan: 16.5-17.3 in (42-44 cm)

Yellow-headed blackbirds are considered to be relatively large blackbirds with large, yellow heads. Their name derives from the Greek word for yellow, xanthous, and the word for head, cephalus. Adults have a pointed bill. The adult male is mainly black with a yellow head and breast; they have a white wing patch sometimes only visible in flight. The adult female is mainly brown with a dull yellow throat and breast. Immature members of both sexes are brown with duller yellow plumage compared to adult males. Immature males also have some white patches on the wing. Both sexes resemble the respective sexes of the smaller yellow-hooded blackbird of South America.

Behavior and ecology

Migration, habitat, and breeding 
These birds migrate in the winter to the southwestern United States and Mexico. They often migrate in huge flocks with other species of birds. The only regions of the United States where these blackbirds are permanent residents are the San Joaquin Valley and the Lower Colorado River Valley of Arizona and California. It is an extremely rare vagrant to western Europe, with some records suspected to refer to escapes from captivity. When migrating, males and females travel separately. Males typically arrive at the breeding marshes 2-3 weeks before females during spring migration. Research suggests that females choose breeding sites based on the reproductive success (number of young per breeding female) of the site in previous years.

The breeding habitat of the yellow-headed blackbird are marshes in North America (mainly west of the Great Lakes), particularly in plants such as cattails (genus Typha), bulrush (genus Scirpus), and common reeds (genus Phragmites). The nest is built with and attached to marsh vegetation and is constructed over open water. They nest in colonies, often sharing their habitat closely with the red-winged blackbird (Agelaius phoeniceus). During the breeding and nesting season the males are very territorial and spend much of their time perched on reed stalks and displaying or chasing off intruders.

Food 
These birds eat seeds during majority of the year and insects throughout the summer months. They forage in marshes, fields, or on the ground; they sometimes catch insects in flight. Sunflowers are fairly popular amongst yellow-headed blackbirds in the Northern Great Plains, with a study indicating that males eat more sunflower than grains and females more grains than sunflower. Some methods of gathering food involve flipping over stones, catching insects from the top of water, and foraging. Foraging methods take place in uplands, with the flock taking a "rolling" formation in which birds fly from the back to the front of the flock to feed. Female yellow-headed blackbirds primarily feed their newly-hatched young insects from the order Odonata, which includes dragonflies and damselflies. Outside the nesting period, they often feed in flocks, often with related species.

Songs and calls 
This bird's song resembles the grating of a rusty hinge. Male yellow-headed blackbirds have been observed to have two types of songs, an "accent song" and a "buzz song". The “buzz songs'' have much higher pitch than the accent song, and thus do not echo as well in the dense marshes they live in. For that reason, buzzing songs are typically done when communicating closer whereas accent songs are done to communicate with birds further in the marshes. Female birds have a song that is described to be similar to the male "buzz song", consisting of harsh grating or buzz sounds. Both sexes are also found to elicit harsh calling notes.

Natural threats 
Yellow‐headed blackbirds have been found to be sensitive to nest predation risk, for example by marsh wrens (Cistothorus palustris), and alter their nest attendance behavior accordingly.

Raptors occasionally prey on yellow-headed blackbird flocks. For example, media outlets reported that on February 7, 2022, a flock of yellow-headed blackbirds migrating to Chihuahua, Mexico, were seen dropping dead in the early morning. According to experts, it is most likely that the birds were killed due to being flushed from above as a result of a predatory bird (presumably a raptor) chasing them, which caused some of them to fly into each other and crash into the ground and nearby buildings.

Conservation 
Because yellow-headed blackbirds typically reside in wetlands, their population numbers depend on the conditions of the wetlands in which they reside. For instance, drainage projects, herbicides/pesticides, and other crop protection methods have impacts on the health of wetlands, and consequently, cause the bird population to fluctuate in number. Currently, yellow-headed blackbird numbers are stable and will likely remain that way in the long term.

Gallery

References

External links

Yellow-headed Blackbird - Cornell Lab of Ornithology
Yellow-headed blackbird - Xanthocephalus xanthocephalus - USGS Patuxent Bird Identification InfoCenter
Video of a female yellow-headed blackbird in Annapolis Valley, Nova Scotia, Canada, well outside its normal range.
 
 

yellow-headed blackbird
yellow-headed blackbird
Native birds of the Canadian Prairies
Native birds of the Plains-Midwest (United States)
Fauna of the Lower Colorado River Valley
Fauna of the Sonoran Desert
yellow-headed blackbird
yellow-headed blackbird
Extant Late Pleistocene first appearances